Iacobucci may refer to:

Adam Iacobucci (born 1986), Australian rules footballer
 Alessandro Iacobucci (born 1991), Italian footballer
 Dawn Iacobucci born (ca. 1960), American marketing professor
Ed Iacobucci, American businessman
Frank Iacobucci (born 1937), Canadian judge who formerly sat on the Supreme Court
 Edward Iacobucci, son of the above, and dean of the University of Toronto Faculty of Law

Italian-language surnames
Patronymic surnames
Surnames from given names